The Taranaki Daily News is a daily morning newspaper published in New Plymouth, New Zealand.

History
The paper was founded as the Taranaki News on 14 May 1857, by friends of former Taranaki Province Superintendent Charles Brown. Brown was the first proprietor of the newspaper and he appointed his political supporter and former Taranaki Herald editor Richard Pheney as its editor. The paper, initially housed in a small wooden building on the east side of Brougham Street opposite the present library, became a strident critic of the Herald and the provincial government. The paper began publishing on Saturdays and in 1885 changed its name to the Taranaki Daily News when it began publishing daily.

The word "Taranaki" was dropped from the masthead about 1962 when the paper's ownership was merged with that of the Herald to become Taranaki Newspapers Ltd, and reinstated in 2004. As of December 2008, the circulation was 25,578.

Taranaki Newspapers Ltd was bought by Independent Newspapers Ltd in 1989 and was then part of Fairfax Media. An electronic version of the paper is available on the Stuff website. The editions from 1900 to 1920 have been digitised by the National Library and are available via Papers Past.

TNL also publishes two free weekly newspapers in the Taranaki region: The North Taranaki Midweek (Wednesdays) and the South Taranaki Star (Thursdays).

Awards 
In 2019, Taranaki Daily News journalist Andy Jackson won News Media Awards' Portrait, Feature or Lifestyle Photography (Regional Category) Award from News Media Works.

References

External links
 Daily News website

Newspapers published in New Zealand
Stuff (company)
Taranaki
Mass media in New Plymouth
Publications established in 1857
1857 establishments in New Zealand